Mike O. Champion (born April 5, 1964) is an American professional basketball player. He was a 6'10", 230 lb. power forward and played  for the NBA's Seattle SuperSonics during the 1988–89 season. Champion played college basketball at Gonzaga University from 1983 to 1987.

Notes

External links
 
NBA stats @ basketballreference.com

1964 births
Living people
American men's basketball players
Basketball players from Washington (state)
Gonzaga Bulldogs men's basketball players
Power forwards (basketball)
Seattle SuperSonics players
Sportspeople from Everett, Washington
Undrafted National Basketball Association players